Markku Lehmuskallio (born 31 December 1938) is a Finnish film director, cinematographer and screenwriter. He has directed 26 films since 1973. Together with his spouse, Anastasia Lapsui, they have directed more than 10 films about the Nenets, the Sami, and other indigenous peoples from around the world. His 1980 film The Raven's Dance was entered into the 30th Berlin International Film Festival, where it won an Honourable Mention.

Selected filmography
The Raven's Dance (1980)
Seven Songs from the Tundra (1999)

References

External links

1938 births
Living people
Finnish film directors
Finnish cinematographers
Finnish screenwriters
Finnish film editors
Finnish film producers
People from Rauma, Finland
20th-century Finnish people